Molana Qamar ud Din is a Pakistani politician who had been a member of the National Assembly of Pakistan, from June 2013 to May 2018.

Political career
He ran for the seat of the National Assembly of Pakistan as a candidate of Muttahida Majlis-e-Amal (MMA) from Constituency NA-269 (Khuzdar) in 2008 Pakistani general election but was unsuccessful. He received 15,938 votes and lost the seat to Muhammad Usman.

He was elected to the National Assembly of Pakistan as a candidate of Jamiat Ulema-e-Islam (F) (JUI-F) from Constituency NA-269 (Khuzdar) in 2013 Pakistani general election. He received 26,028 votes and defeated Mir Abdul Rauf Mengal, a candidate of the Balochistan National Party (BNP).

References

Living people
Baloch people
Pakistani MNAs 2013–2018
People from Khuzdar District
Jamiat Ulema-e-Islam (F) politicians
Year of birth missing (living people)